is the tenth single by Aya Matsuura, a former Hello! Project solo artist. It was released on June 4, 2003 under the Zetima label. The single peaked at #3 on the Oricon weekly singles charts, charting for eleven weeks.

Track listing

References

Aya Matsuura songs
Zetima Records singles
2003 singles
Songs written by Tsunku
Song recordings produced by Tsunku